Carrodus is a surname. Notable people with the surname include:

 Frank Carrodus (born 1949), English footballer
 John Tiplady Carrodus (1836–1895), English violinist
 Joseph Carrodus (1885–1961), Australian public servant
 Trevor Carrodus (born 1952), Australian rules footballer